The blood-eared parakeet (Pyrrhura hoematotis), also known as the red-eared parakeet and in aviculture as the red-eared conure, is a species of bird in subfamily Arinae of the family Psittacidae, the African and New World parrots. It is endemic to Venezuela.

Taxonomy and systematics

The blood-eared parakeet has two subspecies, the nominate P. h. hoematotis (Souancé, 1857) and P. h. immarginata (Zimmer & W.H. Phelps, 1944).

Description

The sexes are the same. Adults of the nominate subspecies are slaty gray from forehead to mid-crown, with bare white skin around the eye and bright terracotta ear coverts that give it its English name. Their nape feathers are green with yellow edges and the rest of their upperparts are green. Their throat, the sides of their neck, and their upper breast are yellow-green with grayish feather edges giving a scaly appearance. The rest of their underparts are green with some reddish brown on the belly and bluish green undertail coverts. Their wing is mostly green with blue primaries. Their tail's upperside is brownish red with green feather tips; its underside is coppery. Subspecies P. h. immarginata has a green crown and nape and reduced scaling on the sides of the neck.

Distribution and habitat

The nominate subspecies of the blood-eared parakeet is found in the Venezuelan Coastal Range between the states of Aragua and Miranda. P. h. immarginata is found in the Andes of southeastern Lara state. The species inhabits the interior and edges of cloudforest and secondary forest, wooded savanna, and clearings with scattered trees.

Behavior

Movement

In the dry season some blood-eared parakeets move into lower elevation semi-deciduous forest.

Feeding

The blood-eared parakeet typically forages in small flocks in the forest canopy. Its diet includes fruits, seeds, flowers, and possibly insect larvae.

Breeding

The blood-eared parakeet nests in the wet season centering in August; nothing else is known about its breeding biology.

Vocalization

The blood-eared parakeet's most common call is "a series of harsh notes, e.g. “krree krree krree” " that is given both from a perch and in flight. Perched birds also call with single "kurree", "kurruk", or "krreekuk" notes, though perched birds are often silent. Flocks in flight "call frequently and simultaneously, producing a noisy, harsh chattering."

Status

The IUCN has assessed the blood-eared parakeet as being of Least Concern, though it has a small range and a population of unknown size that is believed to be decreasing. No immediate threats have been identified. It occurs in several well-protected areas. However, "due to its small range and apparently declining population, this species may be of conservation concern; population estimates are urgently needed."

References

blood-eared parakeet
Birds of the Venezuelan Coastal Range
blood-eared parakeet
blood-eared parakeet
Taxonomy articles created by Polbot